Dave Andrews is a musician and composer of original music for film based in Buckinghamshire UK.

He has toured and played guitar for Wolfsbane and Iron Maiden singer Blaze Bayley, and also for ex-Judas Priest / Beyond Fear / Yngwie Malmsteen's Rising Force singer Tim Ripper Owens.

He was a regular contributor of original music for London's premier horror movie festival, FILM4 FrightFest between 2006 - 2012

Professional background 
Feature film composer credits to date are as follows:

 Beyond Fury (2019), directed by Darren Ward
Inbred (2011), directed by Alex Chandon
 Endless (2011), directed by Matt Bloom
 Unwelcome (2011), directed by Stefan Smith
 The Making Of A Day Of Violence (2010)
 Into The Dark: Exploring The Horror Film (2009), produced by George A. Romero
 A Day Of Violence (2009), directed by Darren Ward

Short film commercial and documentary composer credits include:
 Yarns (with Gareth Humphries)
 Royal Air Forces Association/The Battle Of Britain (directed by David King)
 The Doha/Tribeca Film Festival Trailers (Doha/Tribeca FF 2009)

Short films for the Doha Film Institute:
 Lunchtime (2009)
 Um El-Sebyan: A short film by Wafa Al-Saffar (2010)
 If Only: A short film by Tusilya Muthukumar (2010)
 Garangao Nightmare: A short film by Abdulla Al-Gosaibi (2010)

References

Sources
Lawrence Paterson - Blaze Bayley: At The End Of The Day
Interview with Darren Ward & Dave Andrews: Darkside Magazine October 2008, Issue. 135

External links 
 Live performance with Blaze Bayley in Glasgow/96.3 Rock Radio Birthday Party

Living people
English composers
People from Buckinghamshire
1972 births
Musicians from Buckinghamshire